Riccardo Donato (born 2 February 1994) is an Italian racing cyclist. He rode at the 2014 UCI Road World Championships. The following year, he won the GP Capodarco.

References

External links
 

1994 births
Living people
Italian male cyclists
Place of birth missing (living people)
Cyclists from the Province of Padua